Brad(ley) Adams may refer to:

Brad Adams, American human rights activist
Bradley Adams, producer
Brad Adams (racing driver) in 2010 SCCA Pro Racing World Challenge season

See also
Peter Bradley Adams